The Vistula is the longest river in Poland and the ninth-longest river in Europe, at  in length.

It flows through Poland's largest cities, including Kraków, Sandomierz, Warsaw, Płock, Włocławek, Toruń, Bydgoszcz, Świecie, Grudziądz, Tczew and Gdańsk. It empties into the Vistula Lagoon (Zalew Wiślany) or directly into the Gdańsk Bay of the Baltic Sea with a delta of six main branches (Leniwka, Przekop, Śmiała Wisła, Martwa Wisła, Nogat and Szkarpawa).

The river is often associated with Polish culture, history and national identity. It is the country's most important waterway and natural symbol, and the term "Country upon Vistula" can be synonymous with Poland.

Etymology
The name Vistula first appears in the written record of Pomponius Mela (3.33) in AD40.  Pliny in AD77 in his Natural History names the river Vistla (4.81, 4.97, 4.100). The root of the name Vistula, Indo-European *u̯eis-: 'to ooze, flow slowly' (cf. Sanskrit अवेषन् (avēṣan) "they flowed", Old Norse veisa "slime") appears in many European river-names (e.g. Weser, Viešinta). The diminutive endings -ila, -ula, occur in many tongues in the Indo-European family, including Latin (see Caligula, Ursula).

In writing about the river and its peoples, Ptolemy uses Greek spelling: Ouistoula. Other ancient sources spell the name Istula. Ammianus Marcellinus referred to the Bisula (Book22) in the 380s. In the sixth century Jordanes (Getica5 & 17) used Viscla.

The Anglo-Saxon poem Widsith refers to the Wistla. The 12th-century Polish chronicler Wincenty Kadłubek Latinised the river's name as Vandalus, a form presumably influenced by Lithuanian vanduõ 'water'. Jan Długosz (1415–1480) in his Annales seu cronicae incliti regni Poloniae contextually points to the river, stating "of the eastern nations, of the Polish east, from the brightness of the water the White Water...so named" (Alba aqua), perhaps referring to the White Little Vistula (Biała Wisełka).

Sources
The Vistula river rises in the southern Silesian Voivodeship close to the tripoint involving the Czech Republic and Slovakia from two sources: the Czarna ("Black") Wisełka at altitude  and the Biała ("White") Wisełka at altitude . Both are on the western slope of Barania Góra in the Silesian Beskids in Poland.

Geography
The Vistula can be divided into three parts: upper, from its sources to Sandomierz; central, from Sandomierz to the confluences with the Narew and Bug; and bottom, from the confluence with the Narew to the sea.

One of the features of the river basin of the Vistula is its asymmetry—in great measure resulting from the tilting direction of the Central European Lowland toward the northwest, the direction of the flow of glacial waters, and considerable predisposition of its older base. The asymmetry of the river basin (right-hand to left-hand side) is 73–27%.

The most recent glaciation of the Pleistocene epoch, which ended around 10,000 BC, is called the Vistulian glaciation or Weichselian glaciation in regard to north-central Europe.

Major cities

Delta
The river forms a wide delta called Żuławy Wiślane, or the "Vistula Fens" in English. The Nogat also starts separately as a river named (on this map ) Alte Nogat (Old Nogat) south of Kwidzyn, but further north it picks up water from a crosslink with the Vistula, and becomes a distributary of the Vistula, flowing away northeast into the Vistula Lagoon (Polish: Zalew Wiślany) with a small delta. The Nogat formed part of the border between East Prussia and interwar Poland. The other channel of the Vistula below this point is sometimes called the Leniwka.

Various causes (rain, snow melt, ice jams) have caused many severe floods of the Vistula down the centuries. Land in the area was sometimes depopulated by severe flooding, and later had to be resettled.

See (Figure 7, on page 812 at History of floods on the River Vistula) for a reconstruction map of the delta area as it was around the year 1300: note much more water in the area, and the west end of the Vistula Lagoon (Frisches Haff) was bigger and nearly continuous with the Drausen See.

Channel changes
As with some aggrading rivers, the lower Vistula has been subject to channel changing.

Near the sea, the Vistula was diverted sideways by coastal sand as a result of longshore drift and split into an east-flowing branch (the Elbing (Elbląg) Vistula, Elbinger Weichsel, Szkarpawa, flows into the Vistula Lagoon, now for flood control closed to the east with a lock) and a west-flowing branch (the Danzig (Gdańsk) Vistula, Przegalinie branch, reached the sea in Danzig). Until the 14th century, the Elbing Vistula was the bigger.
 1242: The Stara Wisła (Old Vistula) cut an outlet to the sea through the barrier near Mikoszewo where the Vistula Cut is now; this gap later closed or was closed.
 1371: The Danzig Vistula became bigger than the Elbing Vistula.
 1540 and 1543: Huge floods depopulated the delta area, and afterwards the land was resettled by Mennonite Germans, and economic development followed.
 1553: By a plan made by Danzig and Elbing, a channel was dug between the Vistula and the Nogat at Weissenberg (now Biała Góra). As a result, most of the Vistula water flowed down the Nogat, which hindered navigation at Danzig by lowering the water level; this caused a long dispute about the river water between Danzig on one side and Elbing and Marienburg on the other side.
 1611: Great flood near Marienburg.
 1613: As a result, a royal decree was issued to build a dam at Biała Góra, diverting only a third of the Vistula's water into the Nogat. 
 1618–1648 Thirty Years' War and 1655–1661 Second Northern War: In wars involving Sweden the river works at Biała Góra were destroyed or damaged.
 1724: Until this year the Vistula in Danzig flowed to sea straight through the east end of the Westerplatte. In this year it started to turn west to flow south of the Westerplatte.
 1747: In a big flood the Vistula broke into the Nogat.
 1772: First Partition of Poland: Prussia got control of the Vistula delta area.
 1793: Second Partition of Poland: Prussia got control of more of the Vistula drainage area.
 1830 and later: Cleaning the riverbed; eliminating meanders; re-routing some tributaries, e.g. the Rudawa.
 1840: A flood caused by an ice-jam formed a shortcut from the Danzig Vistula to the sea (shown as Durchbruch v. J 1840 (Breakthrough of year 1840), on this map), a few miles east of and bypassing Danzig, now called the Śmiała Wisła or Wisła Śmiała ("Bold Vistula"). The Vistula channel west of this lost much of its flow and was known thereafter as the Dead Vistula (German: Tote Weichsel; Polish: Martwa Wisła).
 1848 or after: In flood control works the link from the Vistula to the Nogat was moved 4 km (2.5 miles) downstream. In the end, the Nogat got a fifth of the flow of the Vistula.
 1888: A large flood in the Vistula delta.
One main purpose was to let the river easily flush floating ice into the sea to avoid ice-jam floods downstream. This is now the main mouth of the Vistula, bypassing Gdańsk; Google Earth shows only a narrow new connection with water-control works with the old westward channel. The name Dead Vistula was extended to mean all of the old channel of the Vistula below this diversion.
 1914–1917: The Elbing Vistula (Szkarpawa) and the Dead Vistula were cut off from the new main river course with the help of locks.
 1944–1945: Retreating WWII German forces destroyed many flood-prevention works in the area. After the war, Poland needed over ten years to repair the damage.

Tributaries
List of right and left tributaries with a nearby city, from source to mouth:

Climate change and the flooding of the Vistula delta

According to flood studies carried out by Professor Zbigniew Pruszak, who is the co-author of the scientific paper Implications of SLR and further studies carried out by scientists attending Poland's Final International ASTRA Conference, and predictions stated by climate scientists at the climate change pre-summit in Copenhagen, it is highly likely most of the Vistula Delta region (which is below sea level) will be flooded due to the sea level rise caused by climate change by 2100.

Geological history
The history of the River Vistula and its valley spans over 2 million years. The river is connected to the geological period called the Quaternary, in which distinct cooling of the climate took place. In the last million years, an ice sheet entered the area of Poland eight times, bringing along with it changes of reaches of the river. In warmer periods, when the ice sheet retreated, the Vistula deepened and widened its valley. The river took its present shape within the last 14,000 years, after the complete recession of the Scandinavian ice sheet from the area. At present, along with the Vistula valley, erosion of the banks and collecting of new deposits are still occurring.

As the principal river of Poland, the Vistula is also in the centre of Europe. Three principal geographical and geological land masses of the continent meet in its river basin: the Eastern European Plain, Western Europe, and the Alpine zone to which the Alps and the Carpathians belong. The Vistula begins in the Carpathian mountains. The run and character of the river were shaped by ice sheets flowing down from the Scandinavian peninsula. The last ice sheet entered the area of Poland about 20,000 years ago. During periods of warmer weather, the ancient Vistula, "Pra-Wisła", searched for the shortest way to the sea—thousands of years ago it flowed into the North Sea somewhere at the latitude of contemporary Scotland. The climate of the Vistula valley, its plants, animals, and its very character changed considerably during the process of glacial retreat.

Navigation
The Vistula is navigable from the Baltic Sea to Bydgoszcz (where the Bydgoszcz Canal joins the river). The Vistula can accommodate modest river vessels of CEMT class II. Farther upstream the river depth lessens. Although a project was undertaken to increase the traffic-carrying capacity of the river upstream of Warsaw by building a number of locks in and around Kraków, this project was not extended further, so that navigability of the Vistula remains limited. The potential of the river would increase considerably if a restoration of the east–west connection via the Narew–Bug–Mukhovets–Pripyat–Dnieper waterways were considered. The shifting economic importance of parts of Europe may make this option more likely.

The Vistula is the northern part of the proposed E40 waterway, continuing eastward into the Bug River, linking the Baltic Sea to the Black Sea.

Historical relevance

Large parts of the Vistula Basin were occupied by the Iron Age Lusatian and Przeworsk cultures in the first millennium BC.
Genetic analysis indicates that there has been an unbroken genetic continuity of the inhabitants over the last 3,500 years.
The Vistula Basin along with the lands of the Rhine, Danube, Elbe, and Oder came to be called Magna Germania by Roman authors of the first century AD. This does not imply that the inhabitants were "Germanic peoples" in the modern sense of the term;
Tacitus, when describing the Venethi, Peucini and Fenni, wrote that he was not sure if he should call them Germans, since they had settlements and they fought on foot, or rather Sarmatians since they have some similar customs to them. Ptolemy, in the second century AD, would describe the Vistula as the border between Germania and Sarmatia.

The Vistula river used to be connected to the Dnieper River, and thence to the Black Sea via the Augustów Canal, a technological marvel with numerous sluices contributing to its aesthetic appeal. It was the first waterway in Central Europe to provide a direct link between the two major rivers, the Vistula and the Neman. It provided a link with the Black Sea to the south through the Oginski Canal, Dnieper River, Berezina Canal, and Dvina River. The Baltic Sea– Vistula– Dnieper– Black Sea route with its rivers was one of the most ancient trade routes, the Amber Road, on which amber and other items were traded from Northern Europe to Greece, Asia, Egypt, and elsewhere.

The Vistula estuary was settled by Slavs in the seventh and eighth century. Based on archeological and linguistic findings, it has been postulated that these settlers moved northward along the Vistula river. This however contradicts another hypothesis supported by some researchers saying the Veleti moved westward from the Vistula delta.

A number of West Slavic Polish tribes formed small dominions beginning in the eighth century, some of which coalesced later into larger ones. Among the tribes listed in the Bavarian Geographer's ninth-century document was the Vistulans (Wiślanie) in southern Poland. Kraków and Wiślica were their main centres.

Many Polish legends  are connected with the Vistula and the beginnings of Polish statehood. One of the most enduring is that about princess Wanda co nie chciała Niemca (who rejected the German). According to the most popular variant, popularized by the 15th-century historian Jan Długosz, Wanda, daughter of King Krak, became queen of the Poles upon her father's death. She refused to marry a German prince Rytigier (Rüdiger), who took offence and invaded Poland, but was repelled. Wanda however committed suicide, drowning in the Vistula river, to ensure he would not invade her country again.

Main trading artery

For hundreds of years the river was one of the main trading arteries of Poland, and the castles that line its banks were highly prized possessions. Salt, timber, grain, and building stone were among goods shipped via that route between the 10th and 13th centuries.

In the 14th century the lower Vistula was controlled by the Teutonic Knights Order, invited in 1226 by Konrad I of Masovia to help him fight the pagan Prussians on the border of his lands. In 1308 the Teutonic Knights captured the Gdańsk castle and murdered the population. Since then the event is known as the Gdańsk slaughter. The Order had inherited Gniew from Sambor II, thus gaining a foothold on the left bank of the Vistula. Many granaries and storehouses, built in the 14th century, line the banks of the Vistula. In the 15th century the city of Gdańsk gained great importance in the Baltic area as a centre of merchants and trade and as a port city. At this time the surrounding lands were inhabited by Pomeranians, but Gdańsk soon became a starting point for German settlement of the largely fallow Vistulan country.

Before its peak in 1618, trade increased by a factor of 20 from 1491. This factor is evident when looking at the tonnage of grain traded on the river in the key years of: 1491: 14,000; 1537: 23,000; 1563: 150,000; 1618: 310,000.

In the 16th century most of the grain exported was leaving Poland through Gdańsk, which because of its location at the end of the Vistula and its tributary waterway and of its Baltic seaport trade role became the wealthiest, most highly developed, and by far the largest centre of crafts and manufacturing, and the most autonomous of the Polish cities. Other towns were negatively affected by Gdańsk's near-monopoly in foreign trade. During the reign of Stephen Báthory Poland ruled two main Baltic Sea ports: Gdańsk controlling the Vistula river trade and Riga controlling the Western Dvina trade. Both cities were among the largest in the country. Around 70% the exports from Gdańsk were of grain.

Grain was also the largest export commodity of the Polish–Lithuanian Commonwealth. The volume of traded grain can be considered a good and well-measured proxy for the economic growth of the Commonwealth.

The owner of a folwark usually signed a contract with the merchants of Gdańsk, who controlled 80% of this inland trade, to ship the grain to Gdańsk. Many rivers in the Commonwealth were used for shipping, including the Vistula, which had a relatively well-developed infrastructure, with river ports and granaries. Most river shipping travelled north, with southward transport being less profitable, and barges and rafts often being sold off in Gdańsk for lumber.

As a result, the historic Vistula channel through Gdańsk lost much of its flow and was known thereafter as the Dead Vistula (German: Tote Weichsel; Polish: Martwa Wisła). German states acquired complete control of the region in 1795–1812 (see: Partitions of Poland), as well as during the World Wars, in 1914–1918 and 1939–1945.

From 1867 to 1917, the Russian tsarist administration called the Kingdom of Poland the Vistula Land after the collapse of the January Uprising (1863–1865).

In 1920 the decisive battle of the Polish–Soviet War Battle of Warsaw (sometimes referred to as the Miracle at the Vistula), was fought as Red Army forces commanded by Mikhail Tukhachevsky approached the Polish capital of Warsaw and nearby Modlin Fortress by the river's mouth.

World War II
The Polish September campaign included battles over control of the mouth of the Vistula, and of the city of Gdańsk, close to the river delta. During the Invasion of Poland (1939), after the initial battles in Pomerelia, the remains of the Polish Army of Pomerania withdrew to the southern bank of the Vistula. After defending Toruń for several days, the army withdrew further south under pressure of the overall strained strategic situation, and took part in the main battle of Bzura.

The Auschwitz complex of concentration camps was at the confluence of the Vistula and the Soła rivers. Ashes of murdered Auschwitz victims were dumped into the river.

During World War II prisoners of war from the Nazi Stalag XX-B camp were assigned to cut ice blocks from the River Vistula. The ice would then be transported by truck to the local beer houses.

The 1944 Warsaw Uprising was planned with the expectation that the Soviet forces, who had arrived in the course of their offensive and were waiting on the other side of the Vistula River in full force, would help in the battle for Warsaw. However, the Soviets let down the Poles, stopping their advance at the Vistula and branding the insurgents as criminals in radio broadcasts.

In early 1945, in the Vistula–Oder Offensive, the Red Army crossed the Vistula and drove the German Wehrmacht back past the Oder river in Germany.

See also
 Rivers of Poland
 Geography of Poland
 Vistula Lagoon
 Vistula Spit

References

External links

 
 
 History of floods on the River Vistula History of floods on the River Vistula (Hydrological Sciences Journal)

 
Rivers of Poland
Waterways in Poland
Cieszyn Silesia
Rivers of Silesian Voivodeship
Rivers of Lesser Poland Voivodeship
Rivers of Świętokrzyskie Voivodeship
Rivers of Masovian Voivodeship
Rivers of Podkarpackie Voivodeship
Rivers of Lublin Voivodeship
Rivers of Kuyavian-Pomeranian Voivodeship
Rivers of Pomeranian Voivodeship